Rehydroxylation [RHX] dating is a developing method for dating fired-clay ceramics. It is based on the fact that after a ceramic specimen is removed from the kiln at the time of production, it immediately begins to recombine chemically with moisture from the environment. This reaction reincorporates hydroxyl (OH) groups into the ceramic material, and is described as rehydroxylation (RHX). The RHX process produces an increase in specimen weight. This weight increase provides an accurate measure of the extent of rehydroxylation. The dating clock is provided by the experimental finding that the RHX reaction follows a precise kinetic law: the weight gain increases as the fourth root of the time which has elapsed since firing. This so-called power law and the RHX method which follows from it were discovered by scientists from the University of Manchester and the University of Edinburgh.

The concept of RHX dating was first stated in 2003 by Wilson and collaborators who noted that "results ... suggest a new method for archaeological dating of ceramics". The RHX method was then described in detail in 2009 for brick and tile materials, and in relation to pottery in 2011.

RHX dating is not yet routinely or commercially available. It is the subject of a number of research and validation studies in several countries.

Power-law kinetics
According to the RHX power-law, if the weight of a fired-clay ceramic increases as a result of RHX by 0.1% in 1 yr from firing, then the weight increase is 0.2% in 16 yr, 0.3% in 81 yr and 0.4% in 256 yr (and so on). The RHX method depends on the validity of this law for describing long-term RHX weight gain on archaeological timescales. There is now strong support for power-law behaviour from analyses of long-term moisture expansion data in brick ceramic, some of which now extends over more than 60 y. Moisture expansion and weight gain are known to be proportional to each other for a specified material at any specified firing temperature.

Dating methodology
A small piece of the ceramic is first removed, weighed, and heated to 500 °C, effectively dehydrating it completely.  The amount of water lost in the dehydration process (and thus the amount of water gained since the ceramic was created) is measured with a microbalance. Once removed from the furnace, the sample is monitored to determine the precise rate at which it combines with atmospheric moisture. Once that RHX rate is determined, it is possible to calculate exactly how long ago it was removed from the kiln. If the date of firing of a certain ceramic were known from another source, the method could be used inversely to determine the average temperature of the object's environment since firing.

Technical issues
The RHX rate is largely insensitive to the ambient humidity because the RHX reaction occurs extremely slowly, and only minute amounts of water are required to feed it. Sufficient water is available in virtually all terrestrial environments.  Neither systematic nor transient changes in humidity have an effect on long-term rehydroxylation kinetics, though they do affect instantaneous gravimetric measurements or introduce systematic error (i.e. through capillary condensation).

The rate of rehydroxylation is affected by the ambient temperature.  Thus, when calculating dates, scientists must be able to estimate the temperature history of the sample. The method of calculation is based on temperature data for the location, with adjustments for burial depth and long-term temperature variation from historical records. This information is used to estimate an effective lifetime temperature or ELT which is then used in the dating calculation. The ELT is generally close to (but not exactly the same as) the long-term annual mean surface air temperature. For southern England this is about 11 °C.

Any event involving exposure to extreme heat may reset the "clock" by dehydroxylating the specimen, as though it were just out of the kiln.  For example, a medieval brick examined by Wilson and collaborators produced a dating result of 66 years. In fact this brick had been dehydroxylated by the intense heat of incendiary bombing and fires during World War II.

The main application of the RHX technique is to date archaeological ceramics. Yet most archaeological material contains components which causes either addition mass gain or additional mass loss during the RHX measurement process. These components can be an intrinsic part of the object, for example materials added as temper, or compounds which have become incorporated into the object during use, for example organic residues, or compounds which have entered into the object during burial or conservation.

Research
The RHX technique was the product of a three-year study by a collaboration of University of Manchester and University of Edinburgh researchers, led by Moira Wilson. Though it has only been established on bricks and tiles of up to 2,000 years of age, research is continuing to determine whether RHX can be accurately used on any fired-clay material, for example earthenware of up to 10,000 years of age.

The original work of Wilson and co-workers was undertaken on construction materials, bricks and tiles. Transferring the method to ceramics has brought additional challenges but initial results have demonstrated that ceramics have the same “internal clock” as bricks. 
Several other studies have attempted to replicate the RHX technique,

but using archaeological ceramics. These studies have encountered issues with components within the ceramics causing either addition mass gain or additional mass loss during the RHX measurement process. The quality of data generated by the Manchester and Edinburgh groups has been due to analysing fired-clay materials which do not contain these components. Efforts to successfully replicate the original work and overcome the challenges presented by archaeological ceramics are underway in several academic institutions worldwide.

References

History of ceramics
Ceramic engineering
Dating methodologies in archaeology
Ceramic materials